The Berlin Painter (active c. 490–460s BCE) is the conventional name given to an Attic Greek vase-painter who is widely regarded as a rival to the Kleophrades Painter, among the most talented vase painters of the early 5th century BCE (see Pottery of Ancient Greece).

The Berlin Painter along with the Kleophrades Painter was educated by a member of the Pioneer Group, who introduced red-figure painting.

Name vase
The Berlin Painter was named by Sir John Beazley for a large lidded amphora in the Antikensammlung Berlin (the Berlin Painter's name vase).

Side A: satyr and Hermes. Hermes strides to the right swinging his arms. He holds a large kantharos and a kerykeion (herald's wand) in his forward hand, and a small oinochoe in his hand which he swings behind him. He is dressed in a short tunic and chlamys, and wears a winged cap and winged boots. A satyr stands in front of him facing right, his head turned to the left. He is holding a barbiton (lyre) in one arm, his fingers splayed across the strings. In his other hand, held out behind him, he holds the end of a string attached to the lyre. He has a long beard and wears a wreath, and his right leg is shown in three-quarters view. A fawn stands between the two figures, its head gracefully turned up. The figures are carefully superimposed on one another, forming a unified contour isolated against the black background of the vase.

Side B: Satyr. A satyr stands to the right, holding a large kantharos and a lyre. The kantharos is raised to his lips, while he holds the lyre at his side, his fingers touching the stings. His long hair is tied at his neck and he wears a wreath. Above the scene is a carefully drawn band of ivy leaves and grape bunches; below, forming a groundline but not extending all the way around the vase, is a running spiral, a rare pattern ornament in Attic Red Figure vase paintings.

The vase is in good condition. Side A is well preserved, but side B has suffered surface wear and discoloration.

Forms and repertoire

There are no painter signatures on any of the Berlin Painter's attributed works. The Berlin Painter began working in the Late Archaic style and helped develop the Classic style of Attic red-figure pottery. Over a long career he trained many younger vase-painters, including, probably, the Achilles Painter.

He produced a series of Panathenaic amphora, which are his only black-figure vases. (The Panathenaic amphora featured a depiction of the event for which it was the prize, and on the opposite side Athena. The Athena on his Panathenaic amphora was always depicted with a gorgoneion on her shield.) Although it appears that the Panathenaic shape is his favorite, the Berlin Painter utilized a variety of different shapes. He painted a number of Nolan Amphora, and was responsible for the popularity of that form.

On his other vases, painted red figures are usually isolated or paired without framing devices against a glossy black ground, so integral to the forms of their superbly-made bodies that the wares themselves are thought also to have been produced in his shop. The tall figures often start near the middle of the vase and continue over the shoulder, stopping at the neck. He pays close attention to the drapery of their clothing, and their facial features. Most notable is the eye, which is typically open, long, and with the pupil towards the inner eye.

He is also known for his careful stopt key patterns, which border the bottom of his single figures, and are  unique to the Berlin painter and his students. The pattern features alternating meander boxes with alternating saltire squares. The Berlin Painter used dilute glaze to add red tones onto his vases. This is clear on the fawn's coat in his namepiece. Fawns and Greek animals are popular themes in his work, which varied from mythological themes to athletes. His two most popular characters from mythology are Athena and Apollo. From the surviving vases, it is safe to assume that he was a major painter, there are over 400 vases and fragments attributed to him.

The majority of his works have been found across Italy. This may suggest that they were created for export to the Italian market. Many of his valued works were preserved as élite grave goods in the necropoleis of Magna Graecia and Etruria, notably at Vulci, Nola and Locri.

References

Sources

Artcyclopedia - Berlin Painter
The Berlin Painter: Archaeology of the Corpus Present and former whereabouts of the vases attributed to the Berlin Painter.
Perseus Project: "Thirty-three Vases whose Painter is 'Berlin Painter'"
Antikenmuseum, Basel: Lidded Amphora
Altes Museum, Berlin: Amphora attributed to the Berlin Painter 
Martin Robertson. The Art of Vase-Painting in Classical Athens. Cambridge: Cambridge University Press, 1994. .
Andrew J. Clark, Maya Elston, and Mary Louise Hart. Understanding Greek Vases: A Guide to Terms, Styles, and Techniques. Getty Museum Publications, 2002.
Donna Carol Kurtz (editor). The Berlin Painter: Drawings by Sir John Beazley. Oxford Monographs on Classical Archaeology, 1983.
J. Michael Padgett (editor). The Berlin Painter and his World: Athenian Vase-Painting in the Early Fifth Century B.C. Princeton/New Haven 2017.

5th-century BC deaths
Ancient Greek vase painters
Anonymous artists of antiquity
People from Attica
Year of birth unknown